Big Al is a children's picture book written by Andrew Clements and illustrated by Yoshi Kogo.  It was originally released in 1989 through Picture Book Studio, later rereleased via Simon & Schuster.  A sequel, Big Al and Shrimpy, was published in 2002. The book is about a fish named Al who wants to have friends but all the fish are afraid of him.

References

American picture books
Children's fiction books
1989 children's books
Fictional fish